Jānis Ozols (born 4 December 1972) is a Latvian bobsledder. He competed at the 1998, 2002 and the 2006 Winter Olympics.

References

1972 births
Living people
Latvian male bobsledders
Olympic bobsledders of Latvia
Bobsledders at the 1998 Winter Olympics
Bobsledders at the 2002 Winter Olympics
Bobsledders at the 2006 Winter Olympics
People from Jūrmala